Royal Montserrat Police Force FC are a team who competed in the Montserrat Championship. They have won the championship a record five times.

Current Team

References

Football clubs in Montserrat
Police association football clubs